KKCQ-FM (96.7 FM, "Q Country 96.7") is a radio station licensed to serve Bagley, Minnesota. It airs a stereo country music format. News comes from ABC Radio and the Minnesota News Network.

It sits east of downtown Fosston at 30056 U.S. Highway 2, along with sister station KKCQ-AM 1480. Both stations are owned by Jimmy Birkemeyer, through licensee R&J Broadcasting, Inc. The transmitter and tower are northwest of Bagley, Minnesota.

The station was assigned the KKCQ-FM call letters by the Federal Communications Commission on October 1, 1996.

References

External links
KKCQ-FM official website

Radio stations in Minnesota
Country radio stations in the United States
Clearwater County, Minnesota
Radio stations established in 1996